23XI Racing (pronounced twenty-three eleven) is an American professional auto racing organization that competes in the NASCAR Cup Series. It is owned and operated by Hall of Fame basketball player Michael Jordan, with current Joe Gibbs Racing driver Denny Hamlin as a minority partner. The organization fields the No. 23, 45 and 67 Toyota teams for drivers Bubba Wallace, Tyler Reddick, and Travis Pastrana. They currently have a technical alliance with JGR.

History
During the summer of 2020, rumors swirled that Hall of Fame basketball player Michael Jordan intended on purchasing an ownership stake in Richard Petty Motorsports, who fielded the only black driver in the NASCAR Cup Series, Bubba Wallace. Such claims were repeatedly denied by Jordan's management team.

On September 8, 2021, veteran motorsports executive Steve Lauletta was named team president after serving as the interim president since the team's foundation.

On July 12, 2022, 23XI Racing announced that two-time NASCAR Xfinity Series champion Tyler Reddick signed with the team for the 2024 season. On July 23, Hamlin announced that starting in 2023, 23XI would have its own pit crews instead of leasing them from Joe Gibbs Racing.

Car No. 23 history
Bubba Wallace (2021-present)

On September 21, 2020, Jordan and Denny Hamlin announced the formation of a Cup team to begin competition in 2021 with Jordan as majority owner, Hamlin as minority owner and Wallace as the driver. The team bought a guaranteed starting spot in every 2021 race by purchasing a charter from Germain Racing. The team's name, car number and manufacturer were not revealed at the time of the announcement. Hamlin later said that the two had discussed owning a team but that it never came to fruition. On October 22, the team announced its name, 23XI Racing, and would use the number 23 (Jordan's number during his basketball career). On October 30, the team revealed that they will run Toyotas with a technical alliance with Joe Gibbs Racing (whose No. 11 car is driven by Hamlin) and operate out of a shop owned (and formerly used) by Germain Racing. On December 14, 23XI Racing announced that DoorDash, McDonald's, Columbia Sportswear, Dr Pepper, and Root, Inc. will be the sponsors of the No. 23 team in 2021. It was also announced that several crew members of the former Germain operation would join the team as a pit crew. On February 3, it was announced that former Germain driver Ty Dillon (who attempted to make the Daytona 500 with fellow Toyota team Gaunt Brothers Racing) would run the car in the 2021 Busch Clash, as Wallace was not eligible to run the clash.

Wallace finished second in his Duel and finished 17th at the 2021 Daytona 500 after being involved in a last-lap crash. At the Daytona road course he had troubles all day and finished 26th. Wallace struggled out the gate until Phoenix, which was his first strong run of the season. Wallace was running top 15 for most of the day before working his way into the top 10. Following a caution and most of the field pitting, while Wallace stayed out, he restarted first. This move did not work out well for Wallace. Due to him being on old tires and the rest of the field being on new tires, Wallace was quickly cycled out of the first position, dropped back, and wound up making contact with Cole Custer. He ended up finishing 16th. At the 2021 GEICO 500 at Talladega, Wallace had a strong car the entire day. Wallace was running top 10 for a good portion of the day and ended up winning stage 2. This was Wallace's first career stage win. After an overtime restart, Wallace was cycled to the back of the pack and wound up finishing 19th. At Dover, Wallace finished 11th. At Pocono, Wallace finished the first race in 14th, but finished the second race fifth, scoring the team's best finish and their first top-five. He finished third at the 2021 Coke Zero Sugar 400 at Daytona, but he was officially scored with a second-place finish after Chris Buescher was disqualified post-inspection. On September 16, Bootie Barker was named crew chief for the remainder of the season after Wheeler was promoted to Director of Competition. Wallace scored his first career win at the rain-shortened 2021 YellaWood 500 at Talladega, becoming only the second Black driver after Wendell Scott to win a Cup race. Wallace finished the season 21st in points.

Wallace began the 2022 season by finishing in second place at the 2022 Daytona 500. On March 29, 2022, Barker was suspended for four races due to a tire and wheel loss during the 2022 Texas Grand Prix at COTA. Dave Rogers was announced as Wallace's crew chief for Richmond, Martinsville, Bristol, and Talladega. Later in the regular season, Wallace showed strong form, posting four consecutive top-10s at New Hampshire, Pocono, Indianapolis road course, and Michigan. 

After failing to make the driver playoffs at Daytona, it was announced that Ty Gibbs would switch to the No. 23 to allow Wallace to compete in the owners championship with the No. 45. At the Texas playoff race, Gibbs veered into Ty Dillon on pit road, nearly sending Dillon towards a NASCAR official and a group of pit crew members; he was subsequently fined 75,000 and the No. 23 was docked 25 owner points. At Phoenix, Daniel Hemric substituted for Gibbs after the death of his father, Coy Gibbs. Hemric finished 17th.

Car No. 23 results

Car No. 45 history

Kurt Busch and Substitute Drivers (2022)
On August 27, 2021, 23XI Racing announced that Kurt Busch will pilot the No. 45 Toyota Camry in 2022. His long time sponsor Monster Energy will follow him. Following the end of the 2021 season, 23XI purchased the former StarCom Racing's charter for 13.5 million, making it the most expensive charter purchase since the implementation of the system in 2016.

Busch began his 2022 season with a 19th place finish at the 2022 Daytona 500. Despite a promising start with top-five finishes at Phoenix and Atlanta, he suffered from poor finishes at COTA, Richmond, Bristol dirt, Dover, and Darlington. However, he rebounded with a win at Kansas.  At the Pocono race, Busch was not medically cleared after a crash during qualifying, and subsequently missed the last five races of the regular season. Xfinity Series driver Ty Gibbs substituted Busch for the next six races. He finished 16th at Pocono and 17th at Indianapolis. A 10th place finish at Michigan earned Gibbs his first top-10 finish. The following week at Richmond, Gibbs finished 36th, last due to an engine failure. Gibbs finished 26th at Watkins Glen. On August 25, Busch announced he withdrew his request for a playoff waiver. 

Six days later, it was announced that Bubba Wallace would swap rides with Gibbs as the No. 45 entry is still eligible for the owner's championship. Wallace finished ninth at Darlington to open the playoffs. He scored his second career win at Kansas. On October 16, Busch announced he would step away from full-time competition in 2023, with the possibility of running the season on a part-time basis. At Las Vegas, Kyle Larson charged aggressively past Kevin Harvick and Wallace, causing Wallace to scrape the outside wall. Wallace retaliated with a right rear hook on Larson, wrecking both cars down the frontstretch and severely damaging Christopher Bell's car in the process. During the caution, Wallace engaged in a shoving match with Larson. Wallace was suspended for one race for the incident; John Hunter Nemechek was assigned to drive the No. 45 at Homestead.

Tyler Reddick (2023-Present)
On October 15, 2022, 23XI Racing announced that it bought out the remainder of Tyler Reddick's contract from Richard Childress Racing to replace Kurt Busch in the No. 45 for the 2023 season. Reddick originally signed with 23XI for 2024, but Busch's concussion and subsequent retirement from full-time competition led to this move.

Car No. 45 results

Car No. 67 history
Part-time with Travis Pastrana (2023)
On January 17, 2023, 23XI announced that Travis Pastrana would attempt to enter the No. 67 Toyota Camry for the 2023 Daytona 500 with sponsorship coming from Black Rifle Coffee Company. On February 14, Pastrana made the entry field by scoring the second fastest lap among the non-chartered teams. He suffered an accident in the qualifying duel and started in the back for the race. He ended up finishing 11th in the race.

References

External links

2020 establishments in Washington, D.C.
NASCAR teams
Michael Jordan
Auto racing teams established in 2020